Magnusson, or Magnússon, is a surname of Scandinavian origin, meaning son of Magnus.  It may refer to:

Arn Magnusson, fictional character created by Jan Guillou
Árni Magnússon, Icelandic scholar
Arne Magnusson, fictional character from the Half-Life video game series
Birger Jarl, or Birger Magnusson of Bjälbo, founder of Stockholm
Birger of Sweden, or Birger Magnusson, King of Sweden 1284–1318
Daniel Magnusson (born 1991), Swedish professional ice hockey centre
Daniel Magnusson (born 2000), Swedish curler
Eggert Magnússon, chairman of West Ham United F.C.
Eirik II of Norway, King of Norway 1280–1299
Eiríkr Magnússon, Icelandic scholar
Emil Magnusson, Swedish athlete
Eric XII of Sweden, rival King of Sweden 1356–1359
Eric, Duke of Södermanland, or Erik Magnusson
Eskil Magnusson, lawspeaker of Västergötland
Eystein I of Norway, or Øystein Magnusson, King of Norway 1103–1123
Finnur Magnússon, Icelandic scholar and archæologist (also known as Finn Magnussen)
Göran Magnusson (1939–2010), Swedish politician
Haakon Magnusson of Norway, King of Norway 1093–1094
Håkon V of Norway, King of Norway 1299–1319
Håkon VI of Norway, King of Norway 1343–1380
Hilde Magnusson Lydvo, Norwegian Labour Party politician
Hörður Magnússon (disambiguation), several people
Inge Magnusson, Norwegian pretender to King Sverre Sigurdsson
Jon Magnusson, Earl of Orkney 1284–c. 1300
Jón Arnar Magnússon, Icelandic decathlete
Jón Magnússon (politician), Icelandic politician
Magnus Magnusson, Earl of Orkney 1273–1284
Magnus Magnusson, Icelandic/Scottish television presenter, journalist, translator and writer
Magnús Ver Magnússon, Icelandic powerlifter and World's Strongest Man champion
Mats Magnusson, Swedish football player
Olaf Magnusson of Norway, King of Norway 1103–1115
Olafur Magnússon, Icelandic chess master
Pandora, Swedish eurodance artist, real name Anneli Magnusson
Páll Magnússon, president of the RÚV and news anchor for Sjónvarpið
Per Magnusson, Swedish songwriter
Princess Christina, Mrs. Magnuson, sister of the current King of Sweden
Ragnar Magnusson (1901–1981), Swedish long-distance runner
Sally Magnusson, Scottish broadcaster and writer
Sigurd I of Norway, King of Norway 1103–1130
Sigurd Magnusson, Norwegian pretender to King Sverre Sigurdsson
Thomas Magnusson, Swedish cross-country skier
Valdemar Magnusson, Duke of Finland

See also 
Árni Magnússon Institute for Icelandic Studies, academic institute in Reykjavík
Situation Magnusson, a Swedish television program

Patronymic surnames
Swedish-language surnames
Surnames from given names